Estadio Pedro Escartín is a multi-use stadium in Guadalajara, Spain.  It is currently used mostly for football matches and serves as the home stadium of CD Guadalajara of the Segunda División.  The stadium holds 8,000 spectators and opened in 1967.  The stadium is named after Pedro Escartín. In 2017, the stadium also hosted the rugby union test match between Spain and England Counties XV on 3 June 2017, as well the women's rugby union test between Spain and France on 11 November 2017.

References

External links
Estadios de Espana 

Pedro Escartin
CD Guadalajara (Spain)
Buildings and structures in Guadalajara, Spain
Sports venues completed in 1967
Rugby union stadiums in Spain
Sport in Guadalajara, Spain